Lubana (also spelled Lubana, Labana, Lavana, Lubhana) is a merchant and transportation community in India engaged in maritime trade and land trade which includes trading and transportation of goods like saltpetre, silk, diamonds, etc. In the Punjab region, during socio-economic reforms, Labanas overwhelmingly became agriculturists. The Labanas of Punjab and Haryana are mostly Sikhs and speak mainly Punjabi or Hindi.

Etymology
The term Lobana appears to have been derived from Lun or Lavan (salt) and the Bana (trade) The Lobanas were the salt-carrying and salt-trading community In Punjab,Labanas started leaving merchant work and shifted to agriculture profession which turns them to landholding community since times of Maharaja Ranjit Singh.

List of Lubanas

See also
Lubanki dialect
Lavana

References

External links
Tribune article on Labanas

Punjabi tribes
Social groups of Punjab, India
Ethnic groups in India
Social groups of Pakistan
Sikh communities
Sikh names
History of Punjab
Indian castes
Saltmaking castes
Salt industry in India